Sugauli Assembly constituency is an assembly constituency in Purvi Champaran district in the Indian state of Bihar.
It is located District entry point 60.3 kilometres Northeast Old Morden City Mehsi. 19.2 kilometres north of the District headquarter Motihari.

Overview
As per orders of Delimitation of Parliamentary and Assembly constituencies Order, 2008, 11. Sugauli Assembly constituency is composed of the following: Sugauli and Ramgarhwa community development blocks.

Sugauli Assembly constituency is part of 2. Paschim Champaran (Lok Sabha constituency). It was earlier part of Bettiah (Lok Sabha constituency).

Members of Legislative Assembly

Election results

2020

2015

2010

References

External links
 

Assembly constituencies of Bihar
Politics of East Champaran district